Truth Today is a Thai political talk show hosted by Veera Musikapong, Jatuporn Prompan and Nattawut Sai-kua. The talkshow began in 2008 during the Samak Sundaravej government on the National Broadcasting Services of Thailand TV station. After Abhisit Vejjajiva was appointed Prime Minister, the talkshow was cancelled by the Abhisit government due to its pro-Thaksin leanings. In 2009, D-Station began airing the talkshow again.

See also
 National United Front of Democracy Against Dictatorship

External links
 Official website

Political mass media in Thailand
Thai television shows